The panhead is an overhead-valve Harley-Davidson motorcycle engine, so nicknamed because the rocker covers resembled cooking pans. The engine is a two-cylinder, two-valve-per-cylinder, pushrod V-twin, made in both 61 c.i. (EL) and 74 c.i. (FL, FLH) displacements. The Panhead engine replaced the Knucklehead engine in 1948 and was manufactured until 1965 when it was replaced by the Shovelhead.

As Harley-Davidson engines evolved, the distinctive shape of the rocker covers led Harley enthusiasts to recognise an engine simply by identifying the head, with names such as "Flathead", "Panhead", "Knucklehead" and "Shovelhead".

Currently, a number of third-party engine manufacturers produce custom panhead-style engines in a variety of bores, many much larger than the original-design displacements.  Each manufacturer includes upgrades to the original design to improve the performance and reliability while still providing the original styling and overall engine structure.

The "Captain America" chopper used by Peter Fonda in the movie Easy Rider (1969) had a panhead engine, as did the "Billy Bike" ridden by Dennis Hopper's character.

See also
Harley-Davidson engine timeline

Notes

External links
 Images of each style of Harley-Davidson engine
 Panhead site: Dedicated to the Harley-Davidson Panhead

Panhead